Bychkov, and its feminine form Bychkova, is a Russian surname that has been borne by, among others:

Alexander Bychkov (born 1988), Russian serial killer
Ekaterina Bychkova (born 1985), Russian tennis player
Mikhail Bychkov (1926–1997), Russian ice hockey player
Nadiya Bychkova (born 1989), Slovenian dancer
Semyon Bychkov (conductor) (born 1952), Russian-American conductor
Semyon Trofimovich Bychkov (1918–1946), Russian military pilot
Viktor Bychkov (disambiguation), multiple people

See also
16783 Bychkov (1996 XY25), a Main-belt Asteroid discovered in 1996
Ivan Bytchkov, a minor character in GTA IV

Russian-language surnames